The Argentine Institute of Radio Astronomy (IAR) was created in 1962 through an agreement between the scientific agencies CONICET and CIC, and the universities of La Plata (National University of La Plata) and Buenos Aires (University of Buenos Aires). Its functions are to promote and coordinate the research and technical development of radio astronomy in Argentina and to collaborate in the teaching and dissemination of astrophysics and related disciplines. The Institute continues its activities in the dependency of the National Council of Scientific and Technical Research (CONICET), the Commission of Scientific Research of the Province of Buenos Aires (CICPBA) and the National University of La Plata (UNLP). Its current director is Dr. Gustavo E. Romero and its deputy director, Dr. Jorge A. Combi.

The institute is a major center for astronomical research, technological development and technology transfer. Research topics include high-energy astrophysics and compact objects, gravitation and numerical relativity, interstellar medium, planetary science, pulsar astronomy, massive stars, and machine learning with application to signal processing. The IAR has two twin radio telescopes with 30-meter reflective dishes operating at 1420 MHz. In the 1960s, the Carnegie Institution of Washington (CIW) collaborated by sending parts of the first antenna, while the second antenna was entirely built at IAR. Over the years, a variety of receivers have been used in these instruments.

Historical facts

During 1957, the American astronomer Merle A. Tuve from the Carnegie Institution of Washington, motivated by the recent discoveries made by Harold Irving Ewen and Edward Mills Purcell at Harvard of the HI emission from the Galaxy, decided to extend the radio astronomical activity to the Southern Hemisphere. In order to accomplish this task, he visited the most important countries in South America, including Argentina, with the intention of building a regional radio observatory. Radio astronomy began in Argentina with the installation of an 86 MHz solar interferometer at the University of Buenos Aires, and the creation of the Commission for Astrophysics and Radio Astronomy (CAR).

After negotiations between Dr. Tuve and the president of CONICET at that time, Dr. Bernardo Houssay, CONICET created the National Institute of Radio Astronomy (INRA) on April 27, 1962. Dr. Carlos M. Varsavsky, from UBA, was chosen for the Direction of the institute, and Dr. Carlos Jaschek from La Plata Observatory, was appointed deputy director. The name of the new institute would later change to Argentine Institute of Radio Astronomy (IAR). In 1963, the first 30-meter antenna began to be built at the Pereyra Iraola Park (Partido de Berazategui), 20 km from the provincial capital city of La Plata, along with the necessary civil works to house the laboratories, workshops, control rooms and offices. On April 11, 1965, the emission line of neutral hydrogen was detected for the first time at the frequency of 1420 MHz (λ = 21 cm). A year later, on March 26, 1966, the radio astronomical observatory was officially opened at the IAR.
Scientific activities

There are few research groups dedicated to radio astronomy in Argentina, and three of them are based on IAR. Currently, FRINGE, GARRA, GEMMI groups and PuMA collaboration operate at the IAR.

The Radio Interferometry Group (FRINGE) started in 2016 as an association of astronomers whose link involves carrying out interferometric studies in centimeter, millimeter, and submillimeter wavelengths. FRINGE is constituted by researchers and students from the Argentine Institute of Radio Astronomy and the National University of La Plata.

The Relativistic Astrophysics and Radio Astronomy Group (GARRA) was founded in April 2000 with the aim of developing and promoting research in relativistic astrophysics and cosmology from Argentina. The group currently embraces a wide variety of research topics, from particle acceleration and cosmic rays to theoretical gravitation and blazar astrophysics.

The Group of Massive Stars and Interstellar Medium (GEMMI) is mostly devoted to studies of regions of active star formation and infrared dust bubbles.

The Pulsar Monitoring in Argentina (PuMA) collaboration is devoted to the observation, analysis, and development of technology for the investigation of radio pulsars. The collaboration, made up of scientists and technicians from the IAR and the Rochester Institute of Technology, works with the two radio telescopes of the institute, conducting daily observational campaigns. The group collaborates with members of NANOGrav, helping to monitor millisecond pulsars with the aim of detecting gravitational waves.

In addition to these research groups, scientific research is carried out on planetary science, applied mathematics, and scientific philosophy. To learn more, see the institute website page.

Technological development and technology transfer

The IAR's Technology Transfer Area was created during the first years of the new Millennium. The main reason for the creation of this area was the application of the know-how acquired in the field of radio astronomical instrumentation to the solution of specific needs that arise in other areas, particularly in communication and space science. The inherent dynamics of the transfer activities has allowed, over the course of a few years, to bring together numerous young professionals and advanced students from several branches of Engineering. Some of the projects in which the IAR was involved include the satellites SAOCOM, SAC-D, SARAT, SABIA MAR, and the launcher TRONADOR.

Currently, the institute is developing equipment for medical and sanitary use, applying control technology from the space field.

Observatory

The IAR has two radiometers with main reflectors of 30 meters in diameter, dubbed Carlos Varsavsky and Esteban Bajaja, respectively. Due to their characteristics, the IAR radio telescopes are ideal for undertaking projects whose main purpose is the observation of large areas of the sky or projects related to timing of compact sources.

The radio telescopes have also been used to carry out numerous variability studies of blazers, to investigate the radio environments of gamma-ray sources, and in the discovery of supernova remnants.

Currently, the antennas are conducting studies of transient radio sources and pulsars.

See also
 List of astronomical observatories
 List of astronomical societies
 Lists of telescopes

References

External links
 Official site Argentine Institute of Radio Astronomy

Radio telescopes
Astronomical observatories in Argentina